Kethanahalli is a small village in Karimangalam block in Dharmapuri District of Tamil Nadu State, India. It comes under Kethanahalli Panchayath. This is situated between Palacode and Karimangalam and also it is located next to Hanumanthapuram Village. This is located 18 km towards North from District headquarters Dharmapuri. Locals and nearest villagers used to called this village has Kethampatti.

St. Francis Xavier Church is famous church in this village.

Photo Gallery

References

Villages in Dharmapuri district